The Troféu APCA for best film is a prize awarded since 1973 by Associação Paulista de Críticos de Arte, for the Brazilian cinematography productions. Winners are announced in December, and the awards ceremony usually takes place in the first quarter of the following year.

Winners

See also 
 Associação Paulista de Críticos de Arte

References

External links 
 Official Website

Best Picture APCA Award winners
Brazilian film awards